Suomi is a surname literally meaning "Finland/Finnish" in Finnish language. Notable people with this surname include:

Al Suomi (1913–2014), American ice hockey player
Damion Suomi,  American singer-songwriter and guitarist
Eemeli Suomi (born 1995), Finnish ice hockey player
Heidi Suomi (born 1975), Finnish sprinter
John Suomi (born 1980),  Canadian  baseball player
Stephen Suomi, American psychologist
Verner E. Suomi (1915–1995), Finnish-American educator, inventor, and scientist

Finnish-language surnames